East European Comic Con (EECC) is a speculative fiction Fan convention held annually in Bucharest, Romania. It is East Europe's most important event dedicated to fans of comics, animations, video games, as well as TV series and movies.

Events

Visitors are able to attend and take part in contests, video screenings and special sessions with movie and comics celebrities, as well as purchase products specific for this type of event.

The most well-known contests are the Cosplay costume contest and a Quiz contest. The Cosplay costume contest has participants performing a short play while wearing the costume of a character from a comic, video game, animation or movie, while they imitate the character's gestures and behaviors. The quiz contest is focused on anime, manga, TV series, comics and video games. An important part of the event is represented by the PC and console video game exhibitors and competitions. EECC is the largest gaming event in Romania.

History 

East European Comic Con started in the spring of 2013. At its first edition, EECC successfully gathered more than 9,000 “geeks”. It opened the door to some fruitful partnerships and friendships. For two days, fans could participate in a Cosplay contest, LOL Contest, Quiz Contest or Illustration contest, and they could talk to artists or see a different side of their favorite actors. Victor Drujiniu – artist for DC Comics and Dark House, and Remus Brezeanu – the artist of The End of Times of Bram&Ben, and Puiu Manu – one of the best Romanian comics artist, were some of the 22 artists present at EECC 2013.

Locations and dates

References

External links

Multigenre conventions
Comics conventions